George "Bowlegs" Collins was an American baseball right fielder and shortstop in the Negro leagues. He played with the Milwaukee Bears in 1923 and the Indianapolis ABCs in 1925.

References

External links
 and Seamheads

Indianapolis ABCs players
Milwaukee Bears players
Year of birth unknown
Year of death unknown
Baseball outfielders